Stefan Rolf Bergqvist (born 10 March 1975 in Leksand, Sweden) is a Swedish professional ice hockey defenceman.  He was drafted in the first round, twenty-sixth overall, of the 1993 NHL Entry Draft by the Pittsburgh Penguins and played seven games in the NHL with them.

Career statistics

Regular season and playoffs

International

External links

References 

1975 births
Cleveland Lumberjacks players
Asiago Hockey 1935 players
Leksands IF players
Living people
London Knights players
National Hockey League first-round draft picks
People from Leksand Municipality
Pittsburgh Penguins draft picks
Pittsburgh Penguins players
Swedish expatriate ice hockey players in the United States
Swedish ice hockey defencemen
Sportspeople from Dalarna County